The Lower Haight is a neighborhood, sometimes referred to as Haight–Fillmore, in San Francisco, California.

Location
Referred to as "Pine Valley" in the 70s because of all the pine trees, the Lower Haight lies generally along Haight Street east of Divisadero Street, and between Oak Street (or Fell Street) on the north, and Duboce Avenue (or Waller Street) on south. The eastern boundary is variously placed at Webster Street, Laguna Street, or even Market Street. 

It is east of the more famous Haight-Ashbury, which is also known as the Upper Haight. The name derives from the significant elevation change as Haight Street climbs steeply from Scott Street to Buena Vista Park.

The area straddles a shallow valley between Mint Hill and Upper Haight, sloping down from Oak Street (north) toward Duboce (south). Duboce Park, toward the corner of Duboce and Scott, is a grassy park containing a children's playground, dog park, and the Harvey Milk Recreational Arts Building.

Adjacent neighborhoods include the Western Addition/Alamo Square to the north; Duboce Triangle to the south; Hayes Valley to the east; and the Upper Haight to the west.

The San Francisco Association of Realtors defines the area more narrowly as the "Haight–Fillmore" neighborhood, bounded by Steiner Street on the west, Webster Street on the east, Fell Street on the north, and Waller Street on the south. In 2015, many real estate listings inaccurately called the Lower Haight "Hayes Valley" but no part of Haight Street is part of Hayes Valley. The Association considers the neighborhood to be a subset of the Hayes Valley (District 6B).

Attractions and characteristics

A mixture of restaurants, small nightclubs, cafes, drinking establishments, residences, galleries, and hair salons characterizes the Lower Haight.  Neighborhood institutions include John Muir Elementary School, San Francisco Zen Center, The United States Mint, Duboce and Koshland parks, and the Haight Street Art Center.

Lower Haight differs from Upper Haight by having a more diverse population and a smaller number of retail businesses. The Victorian and Edwardian houses tend to be less ornately painted and maintained in the Lower Haight than in the Haight/Ashbury neighborhood, and rent can be lower. The neighborhood has been referred to as having a "grungey, post-punk bohemian" atmosphere.

It can be at times a dangerous place, but the efforts of local residents, a public nuisance lawsuit in the 1990s against the crime-ridden Hayes Valley housing project, a Federal RICO case against inhabitants of the subsequent housing development, and shootings among local gang members, gradually reduced the crime rate.

In response to crime, a moratorium was placed in 2006 on new liquor licenses in the neighborhood.  In 2008, the San Francisco Planning Commission decided that the same historic pattern of crime is no barrier to having multiple medical cannabis dispensaries there.

The San Francisco Zen Center is at the northeast edge of the neighborhood in an elegant brick building designed by famed architect Julia Morgan in 1922.

The area is served by several San Francisco Municipal Railway (MUNI) bus lines and is within a few blocks of all MUNI Metro lines. The heart of the neighborhood, at the corner of Fillmore and Haight, is six blocks from the subway stop of Church and Market, which is also the location of the city's largest supermarket, a Safeway. Surveys show that this neighborhood has one of the highest number of daily trips by bike per capita of any San Francisco neighborhood, and walking is also very popular.

The geography of the Lower Haight lends itself to the most efficient bicycle routing from the Mission District towards Golden Gate Park and surrounding neighborhoods, and the popular bicycle route termed The Wiggle zig zags through this neighborhood.

See also

 Haight-Ashbury
 Shut Up, Little Man!

References

External links

 Lower Haight Neighborhood Site
 Haighteration a blog about the Lower Haight.
 SFStation: Districts: Lower Haight
 Friends of Duboce Park

Neighborhoods in San Francisco
Western Addition, San Francisco